The 2011 Adelaide Sevens, promoted as the International Rugby Sevens Adelaide 2011, was a rugby sevens tournament that was part of the IRB Sevens World Series in the 2010–11 season. It was the Australian Sevens leg of the series, held over the weekend of 2–3 April 2011 at the Adelaide Oval in South Australia.

The competition was won by New Zealand who defeated South Africa 28–20 in the Cup final.

This was the final edition of the Adelaide Sevens, though not of the Australian leg of the IRB Sevens. The Gold Coast became the new host for the next four events beginning in 2011–12. The Gold Coast tournament was moved to the start of the calendar for the IRB series, opening the season in November 2011.

Format 
The teams were drawn into four pools of four teams each. Each team played the other teams in their pool once, with 3 points awarded for a win, 2 points for a draw, and 1 point for a loss (no points awarded for a forfeit). The top two teams from each group progressed to quarter-finals in the main competition, with the winners of those quarter-finals competing in cup semi-finals and the losers competing in plate semi-finals. The bottom two teams from each group progressed to quarter-finals in the consolation competition, with the winners of those quarter-finals competing in bowl semi-finals and the losers competing in shield semi-finals.

Teams 
The following teams participated:

Pool stage

Play on the first day of the tournament consisted of matches between teams in the same pool on a round robin basis. The following is a list of the recorded results.

Pool A
{| class="wikitable" style="text-align: center;"
|-
!width="200"|Teams
!width="40"|Pld
!width="40"|W
!width="40"|D
!width="40"|L
!width="40"|PF
!width="40"|PA
!width="40"|+/-
!width="40"|Pts
|-bgcolor=ccffcc
|align=left| 
|3||3||0||0||110||31||+79||9
|-bgcolor=ccffcc
|align=left| 
|3||2||0||1||89||50||+39||7
|-
|align=left| 
|3||1||0||2||47||72||−25||5
|-
|align=left|  
|3||0||0||3||19||112||−93||3
|}

Pool B
{| class="wikitable" style="text-align: center;"
|-
!width="200"|Teams
!width="40"|Pld
!width="40"|W
!width="40"|D
!width="40"|L
!width="40"|PF
!width="40"|PA
!width="40"|+/-
!width="40"|Pts
|-bgcolor=ccffcc
|align=left| 
|3||3||0||0||111||38||+73||9
|-bgcolor=ccffcc
|align=left| 
|3||2||0||1||86||33||+53||7
|-
|align=left| 
|3||1||0||2||33||81||−48||5
|-
|align=left|  
|3||0||0||3||31||109||−78||3
|}

Pool C
{| class="wikitable" style="text-align: center;"
|-
!width="200"|Teams
!width="40"|Pld
!width="40"|W
!width="40"|D
!width="40"|L
!width="40"|PF
!width="40"|PA
!width="40"|+/-
!width="40"|Pts
|-bgcolor=ccffcc
|align=left| 
|3||3||0||0||100||40||+60||9
|-bgcolor=ccffcc
|align=left| 
|3||2||0||1||89||50||+39||7
|-
|align=left| 
|3||1||0||2||39||81||−42||5
|-
|align=left|  
|3||0||0||3||40||97||−57||3
|}

Pool D
{| class="wikitable" style="text-align: center;"
|-
!width="200"|Teams
!width="40"|Pld
!width="40"|W
!width="40"|D
!width="40"|L
!width="40"|PF
!width="40"|PA
!width="40"|+/-
!width="40"|Pts
|-bgcolor=ccffcc
|align=left| 
|3||3||0||0||85||36||+49||9
|-bgcolor=ccffcc
|align=left| 
|3||2||0||1||57||38||+19||7
|-
|align=left| 
|3||1||0||2||52||45||+7||5
|-
|align=left|  
|3||0||0||3||26||101||−75||3
|}

Knockout stage

Play on the second day of the tournament consisted of finals matches for the Bowl, Plate, and Cup competitions. The following is a list of the recorded results.

Shield

Bowl

Plate

Cup

Reference list

External links

Adelaide Sevens
Australian Sevens
2011 in Australian rugby union